OKKAMO Tri-State Marker is a monument showing the tripoint of Oklahoma, Kansas, and Missouri. It is located at an elevation of 1,016 feet (one source says 1,024 feet) and is about 300 feet north of I-44 and about 1000 feet east of the Downstream Casino and Resort, which is operated by the Quapaw Nation.

A marker built from native stone was erected in 1938 by the WPA, but it is located 50 feet to the west of the actual tri-point. A stand-on plaque was added in October 2004 at the actual site of the tripoint.

See also 
 List of Oklahoma tri-points
 Preston Monument: monument on the Colorado-New Mexico-Oklahoma tripoint
 Site No. JF00-072: monument on the Kansas-Nebraska border
 Site No. RH00-062: monument on the Kansas-Nebraska border
 Texhomex: monument on the New Mexico-Oklahoma-Texas tripoint
 United States Highway 61 Arch: monument on the Arkansas-Missouri border

References 

Border tripoints
Borders of Oklahoma
Borders of Kansas
Borders of Missouri
Works Progress Administration in Kansas
1938 establishments in Kansas
Boundary markers
Monuments and memorials in Kansas